Maine Wildlife Management Areas (WMAs) are state owned lands managed by the Maine Department of Inland Fisheries and Wildlife. The WMAs comprise approximately 100,000 acres and contain a diverse array of habitats, from wetland flowages critical to waterfowl production to the spruce-fir forests of northern Maine on which Canada Lynx, moose and wintering deer are dependent. Spread geographically throughout all counties of the State the properties are available for a multitude of recreational opportunities, with a focus on hunting, fishing and trapping. The focus on offering these types of recreational opportunities is in line with the funding used to acquire such properties, historically accomplished with funding from Federal Aid to Wildlife Restoration and State bonding approved by voters.

List of Maine Wildlife Management Areas (WMAs)
	Alonzo H. Garcelon WMA
	Cambridge WMA
	Caesar Pond WMA
	Erle R. Kelley (Dresden Bog) WMA
	Gene Letourneau (Frye Mountain) WMA
	Gawler WMA
	Howard L. Mendall (Marsh stream) WMA
	Jamies (Jimmie) Pond WMA
	Madawaska Bog WMA
	Martin Stream WMA
	James Dorso (Ruffingham Meadow) WMA
	St. Albans WMA
	Sandy Point (Stowers Meadow) WMA
	Steve Powell (Swan Island) WMA
	Tyler Pond WMA
	R. Waldo Tyler (Weskeag Marsh) WMA
	Ducktrap River WMA
	Hurds Pond WMA
	Merrymeeting Bay WMA
	Plymouth Bog WMA
	Sherman Lake WMA
	Tolla Wolla WMA

See also
Maine State Parks
National Wildlife Refuge
Wildlife Management Area

References

 
Maine